Robert William Alexander was an Irish writer (usual pen name: Joan Butler) (21 November 1905 - December 17, 1979). With regard to the novels he wrote, under the pen name of Joan Butler, Alexander developed a funny style which echoed that of such authors as Thorne Smith and P. G. Wodehouse

Biography
Robert was born on 21 November 1905, in his family's house at Railway Avenue, Sutton, County Dublin, some 12 km northeast of the city center. Robert's father was an electrical engineer who worked with the Great Northern Railway (Ireland). The company ran the Hill of Howth Tramway, which ran between Sutton and Howth railway station, which opened in 1901. The Alexanders were the first family to take possession of one of the houses built by the company for the engineers, in Railway Avenue. The family remained settled there during Robert's (Bobby's) youth. Robert was the fourth son and the youngest child. Mary was the eldest, and John (Jack) and Ellen Christina (Eileen) followed later. Their parents, James and Ellen, were born in Waterford and moved to Dublin when they married.

List of published works

 As Joan Butler
 The Light Lover, 1929
 The Heavy Husband, 1930
 Unnatural Hazards, 1931
 Monkey Business, 1932
 Bed and Breakfast, 1933
 High Pressure, 1934
 Mixed Pickle, 1934
 Trouble Brewing, 1935
 Team Work, 1936
 Half Shot, 1937
 Something Rich, 1937
 Half Holiday, 1938
 Lost Property, 1938
 Happy Christmas!, 1939
 All Found, 1940
 Cloudy Weather, 1940
 Ground Bait, 1941
 Sun Spots, 1942
 Shirty Work, 1943
 Fresh Heir, 1944
 Low  Spirits, 1945
 Rapid Fire, 1945
 Double Figures, 1946
 Full House, 1947
 The Old Firm, 1947
 Loving Cup, 1948
 Heat Haze, 1949
 Sheet Lightning, 1950
 Strictly Speaking, 1950
 Soothing Syrup, 1951
 Deep Freeze, 1952
 Set Fair, 1952
 Gilt Edged, 1953
 Lucky Dip, 1953
 Landed Gentry, 1954
 Paper Money, 1954
 All Change, 1955
 Space to Let, 1955
 Bridal Suite, 1956
 Inside Work, 1956
 Ready Cash, 1957
 Home Run, 1958
 As Robert William Alexander
 Black Pearl, 1926
 The Path of the Sun, 1927
 Trail's End, 1934
 Mariner's Rest, 1943
 Back to Nature, 1945
 Rustler's Trail, 1955
 The Killing at Broken Wheel, 1958
 As Ralph Temple
 Cuckoo Time, 1944
 Head Piece, 1953

References

1905 births
1979 deaths
Irish writers